Potomac, Virginia, is an extinct incorporated town formerly located in Arlington County, Virginia (then called Alexandria County), today the dissolved town's former territory is located within the City of Alexandria, Virginia after municipal annexation in 1930. As a planned community, its proximity to Washington D.C. made it a popular place for employees of the U.S. government to live. Potomac was located adjacent to the massive Potomac Yard of the Richmond, Fredericksburg and Potomac Railroad.

History

The area was developed beginning in 1894 as the communities of Del Ray, St. Elmo, Mt. Ida, and Hume, following a grid plan independent of that of Old Town Alexandria.  Potomac was incorporated as a town in 1908. In 1928, the town had 2,355 residents.

The Town of Potomac was annexed by the independent city of Alexandria in 1930. Today, the Town of Potomac Historic District in Alexandria designates this historic portion of the city, and includes  and 690 buildings. The Town of Potomac was added to the National Register of Historic Places in 1992.

As of 2016, the United States Postal Service still recognizes "Potomac, VA" as an acceptable alternate address for ZIP code 22301, although "Alexandria, VA" is preferred.

See also
Former counties, cities, and towns of Virginia

References

External links

City of Alexandria, official web site
Del Ray History, from the Del Ray Citizens Association
Lynhaven History, from the Lynhaven Citizens Association

Houses on the National Register of Historic Places in Virginia
Geography of Alexandria, Virginia
American Craftsman architecture in Virginia
Geography of Arlington County, Virginia
Bungalow architecture in Virginia
Colonial Revival architecture in Virginia
Former municipalities in Virginia
Historic districts on the National Register of Historic Places in Virginia
National Register of Historic Places in Alexandria, Virginia
Queen Anne architecture in Virginia
1894 establishments in Virginia
Houses in Alexandria, Virginia

Arlington County, Virginia